Alessandro Strozzi (died 1568) was a Roman Catholic prelate who served as Bishop of Volterra (1566–1568).

Biography
On 3 April 1566, Alessandro Strozzi was appointed during the papacy of Pope Pius V as Bishop of Volterra.
On 28 April 1566, he was consecrated bishop by Matteo Concini, Bishop Emeritus of Cortona, with Alfonso Tornabuoni, Bishop Emeritus of Sansepolcro, and Lodovico Ardinghelli, Bishop of Fossombrone, serving as co-consecrators. 
He served as Bishop of Volterra until his death on 4 April 1568.

References 

16th-century Italian Roman Catholic bishops
Bishops appointed by Pope Pius V
1568 deaths